The following is a list of Michigan State Historic Sites in Mason County, Michigan. Sites marked with a dagger (†) are also listed on the National Register of Historic Places in Mason County, Michigan.


Current listings

See also
 National Register of Historic Places listings in Mason County, Michigan

Sources
 Historic Sites Online – Mason County. Michigan State Housing Developmental Authority. Accessed January 23, 2011.

References

Mason County
State Historic Sites
Tourist attractions in Mason County, Michigan